Munster Ridge Road is a planned South Shore Line rail station in Munster, Indiana. It is expected to open to revenue service in 2025. The station is located at Ridge Road and Manor Avenue adjacent to the Monon Trail.

References

South Shore Line stations in Indiana
Railway stations in Lake County, Indiana
Railway stations scheduled to open in 2025